A. Fredric Leopold (November 10, 1919 – January 1, 2008) was an American entertainment lawyer and politician. He served as the mayor of Beverly Hills, California, from 1967 to 1968 and from 1971 to 1972.

Career
Leopold served during World War II as a lieutenant in the Navy where he earned five battle stars. He was a Phi Beta Kappa graduate of Dartmouth College and a Harlan Fiske Stone Scholar graduate of Columbia Law School.
He founded the law firm of “Youngman, Hungate & Leopold” which later became “Leopold, Petrich & Smith” where he earned the nickname "dean of the Hollywood script vetters" as he was one of a very few lawyers who would review programming for legal liability that either involved ordinary people in risky situations or hidden cameras such as Survivor, Cops, or Big Brother.

He received a Lifetime Achievement award from the Los Angeles Copyright Society where he served as president.
Leopold served as mayor of Beverly Hills from 1967-1968 and 1971-1972, as a Delegate to the Democratic National Convention in 1968, served as the Treasurer of the Democratic State Committee, and as Vice Chairman of the Los Angeles County Council of Mayors.

Personal life
He was married 3 times. He had two daughters with his first wife, Georgene and Dorian Leopold. His second wife was Adele Hall, daughter of publisher Dorothy Schiff; they had 2 children,  Fredric Leopold and Theresa "Tess" Leopold. His third wife was Joan Leopold; he also has a stepson, Michael Wilmeth. He was survived by eight grandchildren: Justin, Rebecka, Alexander, Madelyn, Patrick, Caroline, Adele, and Claudia. Funeral services were held at Hillside Memorial Park.

References

Mayors of Beverly Hills, California
Jewish American people in California politics
1919 births
2008 deaths
Schiff family
Dartmouth College alumni
Columbia Law School alumni
20th-century American lawyers
Burials at Hillside Memorial Park Cemetery
20th-century American Jews
21st-century American Jews